East Midlands 3 was a tier 10 English Rugby Union league with teams from Bedfordshire, Northamptonshire and parts of Cambridgeshire taking part.  Promoted teams moved up to East Midlands 2 and there was no relegation.  At the end of the 1991–92 season the division was cancelled due to the merging of all of the East Midlands and Leicestershire leagues, and the majority of teams transferred into the new East Midlands/Leicestershire 3

Original teams

When league rugby was introduced in 1987 this division contained the following teams:

Bedford Queens
Bedford Swifts
Bretton
Bugbrooke
Northampton Heathens
Potton
RAE Bedford
Ramsey (Midlands)
Westwood

East Midlands 3 honours

Number of league titles

Bedford Queens (1)
Bedford Swifts (1)
Bugbrooke (1)
Deepings (1)
Westwood (1)

Notes

See also
East Midlands 1
East Midlands 2
Midlands RFU
East Midlands RFU
English rugby union system
Rugby union in England

References

External links
 East Midlands Rugby Union official website

Defunct rugby union leagues in England
Rugby union in Bedfordshire
Rugby union in Cambridgeshire
Rugby union in Northamptonshire
Sports leagues established in 1987
Sports leagues disestablished in 1992